Archie Creek Camp, in Wasatch National Forest, in Summit County, Utah, was listed on the National Register of Historic Places in 2016.  It is in the general area of Robertson, Wyoming.

It is the location of six log cabins or remnants thereof, built and used between 1890 and 1930.  It was used by the Standard Timber Company during the 1910s through 1930s for producing railroad cross-ties.

References

Log cabins
National Register of Historic Places in Summit County, Utah
1890s establishments in Utah Territory